Michael Engler is an American theater director, and a Directors Guild of America and Emmy nominated television director and producer.

Theater 

His Broadway credits include Eastern Standard, starring Dylan Baker, Patricia Clarkson, Kevin Conroy, and Anne Meara, as well as Mastergate, written by Larry Gelbart, and I Hate Hamlet, written by Paul Rudnick and starring Evan Handler and Alan Arkin.

His direction of the 2003 off-Broadway production of the Alan Bennett play Talking Heads garnered him a nomination for the Outer Critics Circle Award.

Film and television

1990s 

Engler began his career in television with the TV movie Mastergate (1992) based on the play he directed by Larry Gelbart. The following year he worked on the television series Bakersfield P.D., starring Ron Eldard, Giancarlo Esposito, and Brian Doyle Murray, as well as the series Sisters, starring Swoosie Kurtz and Sela Ward.

In 1993 and 1994 Engler directed two episodes of the HBO series Dream On, created by David Crane and Marta Kauffman, and starring Brian Benben and Wendie Malick, as well as an episode of the Claire Danes starrer My So-Called Life, and began directing what would become fifteen episodes of the series Party of Five, on which he was also a producer. The series starred Neve Campbell and Jennifer Love Hewitt.

In 1995 Engler worked on the Mary Tyler Moore series New York News and Under One Roof, starring James Earl Jones, followed by the David E. Kelley series Chicago Hope in 1996, as well as the TV series Profit, starring Adrian Pasdar in 1997.

In 1998 Engler wrote and directed the short film The Victim. In the same year he worked on the short-lived series Significant Others, starring Jennifer Garner, and Cupid, starring Jeremy Piven. Engler wrapped up the 1990s with Time of Your Life, a spin-off of Party of Five. Engler served as a consulting producer on Cupid and a co-executive producer on Time of Your Life.

2000s 

Engler began the decade with the series Once and Again, starring Sela Ward, Billy Campbell, Evan Rachel Wood, and Shane West, followed by the Aaron Sorkin drama The West Wing, the HBO series Six Feet Under, starring Peter Krause and Michael C. Hall, Hidden Hills, and the series My Guide to Becoming a Rock Star starring Oliver Hudson, two episodes of Watching Ellie and an episode of Do Over.

In 2001 Engler began directing for the HBO series Sex and the City for which he would go on to earn one Emmy nomination and two Directors Guild of American nominations.

In 2004 Engler directed an episode of the series Keen Eddie, starring Mark Valley and Sienna Miller, followed by an episode of the HBO series Deadwood, starring Timothy Olyphant and Ian McShane. This was followed by Life As We Know It, which he co-executive produced, and the TV movie Twenty Questions which he also executive produced, and the series The PTA. In 2006, Engler directed the pilot episode for the USA series Psych.

In 2007 Engler directed for the series 12 Miles of Bad Road, starring Lily Tomlin, followed by the TV movies Two Families and Single with Parents, starring Beau Bridges, and the series Privileged, for which Engler served as executive producer on the pilot episode. Engler ended the decade with the TV movie Lost and Found, featuring Brian Cox.

Beginning in 2007, Engler directed eleven episodes of the NBC series 30 Rock, for which he was nominated for a Directors Guild of America Award and an Emmy for directing the episode Rosemary's Baby.

2010s 

Engler began the decade by directing two episodes of the NBC series Parenthood in 2010, and The Big C, starring Laura Linney, for which Engler was an executive producer. He followed with an episode of Go On, starring Matthew Perry, and Nashville, starring Connie Britton and Hayden Panettiere, both in 2012. In 2013 Engler directed the pilot episode for the series Welcome to the Family, starring Ricardo Chavira and Mike O'Malley.

Director filmography

References

External links

American theatre directors
American television directors
American television producers
Living people
Place of birth missing (living people)
Year of birth missing (living people)